Marius Royet (10 January 1881 – 9 January 1915) was a French international football player. Royet played for US Parisienne and was also a France international. He played in the national team's first-ever match against Belgium on 1 May 1904.

References 

1881 births
1915 deaths
Deaths from Spanish flu
French footballers
US Parisienne players
France international footballers
French military personnel killed in World War I
Association football forwards